Eaton Canyon is a canyon on the Caniapiscau River between Rivière du Sable and Goodwood River, about  south of Kuujjuaq and  northwest of Schefferville in Quebec, Canada. It was named by Albert Peter Low after his assistant surveyor David Eaton. Administratively it is located in Rivière-Koksoak, Kativik, Quebec.

References

External links

Canyons and gorges of Quebec
Landforms of Nord-du-Québec
Nunavik
Tourist attractions in Nord-du-Québec
Canada geography articles needing translation from French Wikipedia